Stanley Cursiter  (29 April 1887 – 22 April 1976) was an Orcadian artist who played an important role in introducing Post-impressionism and Futurism to Scotland. He served as the keeper (1919–1930), then director (1930–1948), of the National Galleries of Scotland, and as HM Limner and Painter in Scotland (1948–1976).

Biography 
He was born on 29 April 1887 at 15 East Road in Kirkwall, Orkney, the son of John Scott Cursiter and Mary Joan Thomson.

He was educated at Kirkwall Grammar School before moving to Edinburgh, where he studied at Edinburgh College of Art.  His early paintings were influenced by cubism, futurism and vorticism. From an early age, he clearly had access to great wealth as his accommodation from 1910 is listed as 28 Queen Street, one of the most prestigious addresses in Edinburgh, and not affordable to the average art student.

A banner he designed for the Orcadian Women's Suffrage Society was carried at the Coronation Procession in 1911, and his family in Orkney were keen supporters of the cause for women's rights and local convenor Margaret Baikie, whose portrait he painted in 1946.

During First World War he served as an officer in 1st Battalion, the Cameronians and served in The Battle of the Somme, Amiens and Abbeville. The conditions in the trenches brought on bronchitis and asthma, and he was invalided out to convalesce in the South of France. After recuperating, he returned to the Battalion's base, but was once again hospitalised and in danger of becoming 'unfit for service'. However he managed to continue service by transferring to the 4th Field Ordnance Survey Battalion at 4th Army Headquarters and developed new and faster methods for processing aerial photographs. In particular, he devised a clever method of projecting the photographic negative taken from a spotter plane which replicated the tilt present when the photograph was taken – the technique of single photo-optical rectification. This greatly speeded up the process of rapid fixing of enemy gun emplacements. During the War, he also learned to use radio (becoming President of the Edinburgh Radio Society). He was Mentioned in Dispatches twice and received a military OBE. During the Second World War he initially worked at the Ordnance Survey Department in Southampton (1939–40) and then moved to the same organisation in Edinburgh (1940–1945). He received a military CBE in 1948.

After the First World War he adopted a more realist style.

Cursiter became an Associate of the Royal Scottish Academy in 1927, a full Academician in 1937 and served as Secretary to the Academy from 1953 to 1955.  He was the first Secretary of the Royal Fine Art Commission for Scotland and was appointed Keeper of the National Galleries of Scotland in 1930, a post he held until 1948. That same year, he was granted the Freedom of Kirkwall and was appointed as the King's (later to be Queen's) Painter and Limner for Scotland, a position he held until his death.

He painted watercolour landscapes of East Lothian, Orkney and Shetland, and designed Saint Rognvald Chapel in St Magnus Cathedral in Kirkwall.  He is particularly renowned for his portraits and is considered amongst the finest Scottish portraitists of the 20th Century.  He painted 'Her Majesty The Queen receiving the Honours of Scotland' in the High Kirk of St Giles in 1953, this painting hangs on the Great Stair, Palace of Holyroodhouse, Edinburgh.

Aberdeen University awarded him an honorary doctorate (LLD) in 1959. He was elected a Fellow of the Royal Society of Edinburgh in 1938, a rare accolade for an artist. His proposers were James Pickering Kendall, Leonard Dobbin, James Watt, and Sir Ernest Wedderburn.

Cursiter was influential in the campaign to create a Scottish National Gallery of Modern Art.

He died in Stromness on 22 April 1976.

Family 

He married Phylliss Hourston on 14 October 1916.

His older sister Jessie Cursiter (1881–1916) is buried in Dean Cemetery in Edinburgh.

Selected works 
 Rain on Princes Street, 1913
 The Regatta, 1913
 Villefranche,circa 1920
 The Fair Isle Jumper, 1923
 Geo at Yesnaby and Brough of Bigging, 1929
 Window – Burnstane House, circa 1935
 The Old Store, Stromness, 1950
 The Honours of Scotland, 1954
 Landscape in the Orkney Islands, 1954

References

External links

 Biography on the Gazetteer for Scotland
 Some examples of Cursiter's work in his Modernist style

1887 births
1976 deaths
People from Kirkwall
Alumni of the Edinburgh College of Art
20th-century Scottish painters
Scottish male painters
Scottish portrait painters
Commanders of the Order of the British Empire
Cameronians officers
Royal Scottish Academicians
Fellows of the Royal Society of Edinburgh
Scottish curators
Cameronians soldiers
Scottish cartographers
Scottish civil servants
Scottish watercolourists
Fellows of the Royal Incorporation of Architects in Scotland
Presidents of the Society of Scottish Artists
20th-century Scottish male artists